This is a list of Academy Award winners and nominees from Nordic countries: Denmark, Finland, Iceland, Norway, and Sweden. This list is current as of the 94th Academy Awards.

Acting

Actor in a Leading Role

Actress in a Leading Role

Actor in a Supporting Role

Actress in a Supporting Role

Production Design

Cinematography

Costume Design

Makeup and Hairstyling

Editing

Visual Effects

Director

International Feature Film

This list focuses on films from Nordic countries that won or were nominated for the International Feature Film award.

Animated Feature
This list focuses on Nordic films that won or were nominated for the Best Animated Feature award.

Animated Short
This list focuses on Nordic films that won or were nominated for the animated, short film award.

Live Action Short
This list focuses on Nordic films that won or were nominated for the live action, short film award.

Documentary
This list focuses on Nordic films that won or were nominated for the Best Documentary award.

Best Documentary (Short Subject)

Music

Original Song

Original Score

Best Picture

Writing

Adapted Screenplay

Original Screenplay

Sound

Sound

Sound Editing

Sound Mixing

Special Categories

Irving G. Thalberg Memorial Award
This list focuses on recipients of Irving G. Thalberg Memorial Award.

Academy Honorary Award
This list focuses on recipients of the Academy Honorary Award.

Technical & Scientific

Number of nominations/wins by country

References

Lists of Academy Award winners and nominees by nationality or region
Scandinavian culture
European film awards